George Charles (German: Georg Karl) of Hesse-Darmstadt (14 June 1754 - 28 January 1830, Schüttrisberg, now in Slovakia) was a German prince of the House of Hesse-Darmstadt. He was the fourth child and third son of Prince George William of Hesse-Darmstadt and his wife, Countess Maria Louise Albertine of Leiningen-Dagsburg-Falkenburg. He never married and didn't have any children.

Ancestry

References 

1754 births
1830 deaths
George Charles
George Charles